Médéa District is a district of Médéa Province, Algeria. In 2008 the population was 152,607.

The district is further divided into 3 municipalities:
Médéa
Draa Essamar
Tamesguida

Notable people
 Mohamed Belhocine (born 1951), Algerian medical scientist, professor of internal medicine and epidemiology.

Districts of Médéa Province